Charlotte's Web is a book of children's literature by American author E. B. White and illustrated by Garth Williams; it was published on October 15, 1952, by Harper & Brothers. The novel tells the story of a livestock pig named Wilbur and his friendship with a barn spider named Charlotte. When Wilbur is in danger of being slaughtered by the farmer, Charlotte writes messages praising Wilbur such as "Some Pig" and "Humble" in her web in order to persuade the farmer to let him live.

Written in White's dry, low-key manner, Charlotte's Web is considered a classic of children's literature, enjoyed by adults as well as children. The description of the experience of swinging on a rope swing at the farm is an often-cited example of rhythm in writing, as the pace of the sentences reflects the motion of the swing. In 2000, Publishers Weekly listed the book as the best-selling children's paperback of all time.

Charlotte's Web was adapted into an animated feature by Hanna-Barbera Productions and Sagittarius Productions in 1973. Paramount released a direct-to-video sequel, Charlotte's Web 2: Wilbur's Great Adventure, in the U.S. in 2003 (Universal released the film internationally). A live-action film version of E. B. White's original story was released in 2006. A video game based on this adaptation was also released in 2006.

Plot summary 
After a little girl named Fern Arable pleads for the life of the runt of a litter of piglets, her father gives her the pig to nurture, and she names him Wilbur. She treats him as a pet, but a month later, Wilbur is no longer small, and is sold to Fern's uncle, Homer Zuckerman. In Zuckerman's barnyard, Wilbur yearns for companionship, but is snubbed by the other animals. He is befriended by a barn spider named Charlotte, whose web sits in a doorway overlooking Wilbur's enclosure. When Wilbur discovers that he is being raised for slaughter, she promises to hatch a plan guaranteed to spare his life. Fern often sits on a stool, listening to the animals' conversation, but over the course of the story, as she starts to mature, she begins to find other interests. 

As the summer passes, Charlotte ponders the question of how to save Wilbur. At last, she comes up with a plan, which she proceeds to implement. Reasoning that Zuckerman would not kill a famous pig, Charlotte weaves words and short phrases in praise of Wilbur into her web. Charlotte weaves the words "Some Pig" into the web, and the next morning Lurvy sees the web and runs to find Mr. Zuckerman. This makes Wilbur, and the barn as a whole, into tourist attractions, as many people believe the webs to be miracles. After that, Charlotte weaves the word "Terrific" into the web, and then the whole thing starts up again. Charlotte then tells Templeton, a barn rat, to get another word for the web. He goes to the dump and finds the word "radiant" which she then weaves into her web. Fern's mother starts to get worried that she is spending too much time around the animals because she is telling her mother stories about the animals talking. Mrs. Arable then goes to visit Dr. Dorian, who persuades her that being among animals is natural and likely therapeutic for Fern. 

Wilbur is eventually entered into the county fair, and Charlotte, as well as Templeton, accompany him. He fails to win the blue ribbon, but is awarded a special prize by the judges. Charlotte weaves the last words into her web, "Humble." Charlotte hears the presentation of the award over the public address system and realizes that the prize means Zuckerman will cherish Wilbur for as long as the pig lives, and will never slaughter him for his meat. However, Charlotte, being a barn spider with a naturally short lifespan, is already dying of natural causes by the time the award is announced. Knowing that she has saved Wilbur, and satisfied with the outcome of her life, she does not return to the barn with Wilbur and Templeton, and instead remains at the fairgrounds to die. However, she allows Wilbur to take with him her egg sac, from which her children will hatch in the spring. Meanwhile, Fern, who has matured significantly since the beginning of the novel, loses interest in Wilbur and starts paying more attention to boys her age. She misses most of the fair's events in order to go on the Ferris wheel with Henry Fussy, one of her classmates.

Wilbur waits out the winter, a winter he would not have survived but for Charlotte. He is initially delighted when Charlotte's children hatch, but is later devastated when most leave the barn. Only three remain to take up residence in Charlotte's old doorway. Pleased at finding new friends, Wilbur names one of them Nellie, while the remaining two name themselves Joy and Aranea. Further generations of spiders keep Wilbur company in subsequent years.

Characters 
 Wilbur is a rambunctious pig, the runt of his litter. He is often strongly emotional.
 Charlotte A. Cavatica, or simply Charlotte, is a spider who befriends Wilbur. In some passages, she is the heroine of the story.
 John Arable: Wilbur's first owner. 
 Fern Arable, John's daughter, who adopts Wilbur when he's a piglet, and later visits him. She is the only human in the story capable of understanding animal conversation.
 Lurvy, the hired man at Zuckerman's farm, who is the first to read the message in Charlotte's web.
 Templeton is a rat who helps Charlotte and Wilbur only when offered food. He serves as a somewhat caustic, self-serving comic relief to the plot.
 Avery Arable is the elder brother of Fern and John's son. Like Templeton, he is a source of comic relief.
 Homer Zuckerman is Fern's uncle who keeps Wilbur in his barn. He has a wife named Edith and an assistant named Lurvy.
 Other animals in Zuckerman's barn, with whom Wilbur converses, include a disdainful lamb, a talkative goose, and an intelligent "old sheep".
 Henry Fussy is a boy of Fern's age, of whom Fern becomes fond.
 Dr. Dorian is the family physician/psychologist consulted by Fern's mother and something of a wise old man character. 
 Uncle is a large pig whom Charlotte disdains for coarse manners and Wilbur's rival at the fair.
 Charlotte's children are the 514 children of Charlotte. Although they were born at the barn, all but three of them (Aranea, Joy, and Nellie) go their own ways by ballooning.

Themes

Death 
Death is a major theme seen throughout Charlotte's Web and is brought forth by that of the spider, Charlotte. According to Norton D. Kinghorn, Charlotte's web acts as a barrier that separates two worlds. These worlds are that of life and death. Scholar Amy Ratelle says that through Charlotte's continual killing and eating of flies throughout the novel, White makes the concept of death normal for Wilbur and for the readers. Neither Wilbur nor the rat Templeton see death as a part of their lives; Templeton sees it only as something that will happen at some time in the distant future, while Wilbur views it as the end of everything.

Wilbur constantly has death on his mind at night when he is worrying over whether or not he will be slaughtered. Even though Wilbur is able to escape his death, Charlotte, the spider who takes care of Wilbur, is not able to escape her own. Charlotte passes away, but according to Trudelle H. Thomas, "Yet even in the face of death, life continues and ultimate goodness wins out". Jordan Anne Deveraux explains that E.B. White discusses a few realities of death.  From the novel, readers learn that death can be delayed, but that no one can avoid it forever.

Change 
For Norton D. Kinghorn, Charlotte's web also acts as a signifier of change. The change Kinghorn refers to is that of both the human world and the farm/barn world. For both of these worlds change is something that cannot be avoided. Along with the changing of the seasons throughout the novel, the characters also go through their own changes. Jordan Anne Deveraux also explains that Wilbur and Fern each go through their changes to transition from childhood closer to adulthood throughout the novel. This is evidenced by Wilbur accepting death and Fern giving up her dolls. Wilbur grows throughout the novel, allowing him to become the caretaker of Charlotte's children just as she was a caretaker for him, as is explained by scholar Sue Misheff. But rather than accept the changes that are forced upon them, according to Sophie Mills, the characters aim to go beyond the limits of change. In a different way, Wilbur goes through a change when he switches locations. Amy Ratelle explains that when he moves from Fern's house to Homer Zuckerman's farm, Wilbur goes from being a loved pet to a farm animal.

Innocence 
Fern, the little girl in the novel, goes from being a child to being more of an adult. As she goes through this change, Kinghorn notes that it can also be considered a fall from innocence. Wilbur also starts out young and innocent at the beginning of the novel. A comparison is drawn between the innocence and youth of Fern and Wilbur. Sophie Mills states that the two characters can identify with one another.  Both Wilbur and Fern are, at first, horrified by the realization that life must end; however, by the end of the novel, both characters learn to accept that, eventually, everything must die. According to Matthew Scully, the novel presents the difference in the worldview of adults versus the world view of children.  Children, such as Fern, believe killing another for food is wrong, while adults have learned that it is natural.

History 
Charlotte's Web was published three years after White began writing it.  White's editor Ursula Nordstrom said that one day in 1952, E. B. White arrived at her office and handed her a new manuscript, the only copy of Charlotte's Web then in existence, which she read soon after and enjoyed. Charlotte's Web was released on October 15, 1952.

Since White published Death of a Pig in 1948, an account of his own failure to save a sick pig (bought for butchering), Charlotte's Web can be seen as White's attempt "to save his pig in retrospect".  White's overall motivation for the book has not been revealed and he has written "I haven't told why I wrote the book, but I haven't told you why I sneeze, either. A book is a sneeze".

When White met the spider who originally inspired Charlotte, he called her Charlotte Epeira (after Epeira sclopetaria, the Grey Cross spider, now known as Larinioides sclopetarius), before discovering that the more modern name for that genus was Aranea. In the novel, Charlotte gives her full name as "Charlotte A. Cavatica", revealing her as a barn spider, an orb-weaver with the scientific name Araneus cavaticus.

The arachnid anatomical terms (mentioned in the beginning of chapter nine) and other information that White used, came mostly from American Spiders by Willis J. Gertsch and The Spider Book by John Henry Comstock, both of which combine a sense of poetry with scientific fact. White incorporated details from Comstock's accounts of baby spiders, most notably the "flight" of the young spiders on silken parachutes. White sent Gertsch's book to illustrator Garth Williams. Williams' initial drawings depicted a spider with a woman's face, and White suggested that he simply draw a realistic spider instead.

White originally opened the novel with an introduction of Wilbur and the barnyard (which later became the third chapter) but decided to begin the novel by introducing Fern and her family on the first page. White's publishers were at one point concerned with the book's ending and tried to get White to change it.

Charlotte's Web has become White's most famous book; but White treasured his privacy and that of the farmyard and barn that helped inspire the novel, which have been kept off limits to the public according to his wishes.

Reception 
Charlotte's Web was generally well-reviewed when it was released. In The New York Times, Eudora Welty wrote, "As a piece of work it is just about perfect, and just about magical in the way it is done." Aside from its paperback sales, Charlotte's Web is 78th on the all-time bestselling hardback book list.  According to publicity for the 2006 film adaptation (see below), the book has sold more than 45 million copies and been translated into 23 languages.  It was a Newbery Honor book for 1953, losing to Secret of the Andes by Ann Nolan Clark for the medal. In 1970, White won the Laura Ingalls Wilder Medal, a major prize in the field of children's literature, for Charlotte's Web, along with his first children's book, Stuart Little, published in 1945.
Seth Lerer, in his book Children's Literature, finds that Charlotte represents female authorship and creativity, and compares her to other female characters in children's literature such as Jo March in Little Women and Mary Lennox in The Secret Garden. Nancy Larrick brings to attention the "startling note of realism" in the opening line, "Where's Papa going with that Ax?"

Illustrator Henry Cole expressed his deep childhood appreciation of the characters and story, and calls Garth Williams' illustrations full of "sensitivity, warmth, humor, and intelligence." Illustrator Diana Cain Bluthenthal states that Williams' illustrations inspired and influenced her.

There is an unabridged audio book read by White himself which reappeared decades after it had originally been recorded. Newsweek writes that White reads the story "without artifice and with a mellow charm," and that "White also has a plangency that will make you weep, so don't listen (at least, not to the sad parts) while driving." Joe Berk, president of Pathway Sound, had recorded Charlotte's Web with White in White's neighbor's house in Maine (which Berk describes as an especially memorable experience) and released the book in LP. Bantam released Charlotte's Web alongside Stuart Little on CD in 1991, digitally remastered, having acquired the two of them for rather a large amount.

In 2005, a school teacher in California conceived of a project for her class in which they would send out hundreds of drawings of spiders (each representing Charlotte's child Aranea going out into the world so that she can return and tell Wilbur of what she has seen) with accompanying letters; they ended up visiting a large number of parks, monuments, and museums, and were hosted by and/or prompted  responses from celebrities and politicians such as John Travolta and then-First Lady Laura Bush.

In 2003 Charlotte's Web was listed at number 170 on the BBC's The Big Read poll of the UK's 200 "best-loved novels." A 2004 study found that Charlotte's Web was a common read-aloud book for third-graders in schools in San Diego County, California. Based on a 2007 online poll, the National Education Association listed the book as one of its "Teachers' Top 100 Books for Children." It was one of the "Top 100 Chapter Books" of all time in a 2012 poll by School Library Journal.

In 2010, the New York Public Library reported that Charlotte's Web was the sixth most borrowed book in the library's history.

Its awards and nominations include:
 John Newbery Medal (1953)
 Horn Book Fanfare (1952)
 Laura Ingalls Wilder Medal (1970) (awarded to White for his children's books: Charlotte's Web and Stuart Little)
 Massachusetts Children's Book Award (1984)

Adaptations

Film 

The book was adapted into an animated feature of the same name in 1973 by Hanna-Barbera Productions and Sagittarius Productions with a score by the Sherman Brothers. In 2003, a direct-to-video sequel to that film, Charlotte's Web 2: Wilbur's Great Adventure, was released by Paramount Pictures.

In 2006, Paramount Pictures, with Walden Media, Kerner Entertainment Company, and Nickelodeon Movies, produced a live-action adaptation, starring Dakota Fanning as Fern and Julia Roberts as the voice of Charlotte, released on December 15, 2006.

Scrapped television miniseries 
On March 8, 2022, it was announced that Sesame Workshop was working on an animated miniseries based on the book. It was in production for a few months, and was slated to premiere in 2024 on Cartoon Network and HBO Max. On November 3, 2022, it was announced that the miniseries would not be moving forward.

Stage

A musical production was created with music and lyrics by Charles Strouse.

 Tricycle Productions (Montreal, Canada) produced a touring version of Charlotte's Web in 1996 with arrangements of Strouse's score by Canadian composer Derek Aasland.

Video game

A video game of the 2006 film was developed by Backbone Entertainment and published by THQ and Sega, and released on December 12, 2006, for the Game Boy Advance, Nintendo DS and PC. A separate game also based on the film was released a year later for the PlayStation 2 developed by Blast! Entertainment.

Ebook 
On March 17, 2015, HarperCollins Children's Books released an ebook version.

See also

The Tale of Little Pig Robinson
Death in children's literature

References

Sources

External links 

 Charlotte's Web home page at publisher's site

1952 American novels
1952 children's books
American bildungsromans
American children's novels
American novels adapted into films
Children's novels about animals
Farms in fiction
Harper & Brothers books
Newbery Honor-winning works
Novels about friendship
Pigs in literature
Spiders in popular culture
Works by E. B. White